Cleopomiarus is a genus of beetles belonging to the family Curculionidae.

The genus was first described by Pierce in 1919.

The species of this genus are found in Eurasia and Southern Africa.

Species:
 Cleopomiarus distinctus
 Cleopomiarus graminis
 Cleopomiarus micros

References

Curculionidae
Curculionidae genera